50 meter running target or 50 meter running boar is an ISSF shooting event, shot with a .22-calibre rifle at a target depicting a boar moving sideways across a 10-meter wide opening. It was devised as a replacement for 100 meter running deer in the 1960s and made its way into the Olympic programme in 1972. Although replaced there by the airgun version, 10 meter running target, in 1992, it still is part of the ISSF World Shooting Championships and continental championships.

Just like in 10 meter running target, half of the runs are slow (target visible for 5 seconds), and half are fast (target visible for 2.5 seconds)

World Championships, Men

World Championships, Men Team

World Championships, total medals

Current world records 

ISSF shooting events
Rifle shooting sports
Running target shooting